Nilanga Taluka is a taluka, administrative subdivision, of Latur District in Maharashtra, India.  The administrative center for the taluka is the town of Nilanga. In the 2011 census there were 116 panchayat villages in Nilanga Taluka.

See also
Bhutmugli
Limbala The village of Ajit Shivaji Pawar tal- Nilanga D-Latur

Notes

External links
 

Nilanga